HMS Monkey was a schooner of the British Royal Navy at the Jamaica station. She was the merchant schooner Courier, built 1827. The Navy purchased her in October 1831 at Bermuda and renamed her Monkey.

There is a prize money notice awarding salvage to those members of Blossoms crew who were aboard Monkey at the saving of the cargo of the brig Charles, of Boston, on 1 May 1832. At the time, Monkeys commander was Lieutenant Samuel Mercer.

Notes and citations
Notes

Citations

1827 ships
Schooners of the Royal Navy
Merchant ships of the United Kingdom